Eugene Kontorovich (born 1975) is a legal scholar, specializing in constitutional and international law.

Career
Kontorovich studied law at the University of Chicago. He later clerked for Judge Richard Posner on the U.S. Court of Appeals. In 2011, he received a fellowship at the Institute for Advanced Study in Princeton, and was later awarded the Federalist Society's Bator Award, given annually to a young scholar under 40.

From 2011 to 2018, Kontorovich worked as  a professor at Northwestern University School of Law. Since then he has served as a Professor of Law at Antonin Scalia Law School.

Kontorovich coined the term "gaolbalization" (gaol + globalization): the practice of one country sending its excess prison population to another country with excess capacity. He has been active in opposing boycotts of Israel and its settlements, including standing before a special US congressional committee on the topic.

Kontorovich is a fellow of the Jerusalem Center for Public Affairs, and heads the international law department at the Kohelet Policy Forum. He occasionally writes for The Washington Post and The Jerusalem Post.

Israel advocacy
Kontorovich is a proponent of using anti-BDS laws to combat the BDS movement. He has helped many US states draft such legislation. In 2016, Kontorovich served as an expert advisor to the group that sued the American Studies Association over its 2013 decision to boycott of Israeli academic institutions.

Personal life
Born in Kyiv, Ukraine, Kontorovich moved to the US with his parents at the age of three. He immigrated to Israel in 2013 with his wife and four children, and lived in the Alon Shvut settlement.

References

External links

Northwestern University Pritzker School of Law faculty
The Washington Post people
Living people
Ukrainian emigrants to the United States
University of Chicago faculty
Neoconservatism
1975 births
Northwestern University faculty